The Malir Cantonment is a cantonment town of the city of Karachi, in Sindh, Pakistan. It serves as a military base and residential establishment.

History 
Declared a cantonment by the Royal British Government as POW Camp by Muhammad Irfan Malik and Ismail Sherwani on 11 October 1941, in the exigencies of World War II, this cantonment was taken over by the Pakistan Army in 1947. This cantonment serves as the main cantonment of Southern areas of Sindh province. It houses civil residences like the Cantonment Bazar Area, DOHS l & 2, Askari-5 and Falcon Complex, Army Cantonment is stretched over an area of 12 square kilometers.

Governance

Malir Cantonment is administratively governed through "Cantonment Board Malir", a Local Body by its charter, under the jurisdiction of Ministry of Defence, through the Military Lands and Cantonment Department (ML&C), headed by a Director General. The governance of the Cantonment Board derives authority from the Cantonment Act, 1924 and rules and regulations made there under. The cantonment maintains its own infrastructure of water supply, electricity and is outside the jurisdiction of City District Government Karachi.

Population 
Roughly it is around 180,000 and includes all the ethnic and linguistic groups of Pakistan.
Majority of its population consists of serving and retired armed services personnel along with notable civilian businessmen and bureaucrats.

Landmarks
Fazaia Inter College, Malir cantt. karachi.
 Army public school north
 Army public school south
Bistro Tonight (Chinese, BBQ, Fast Food and Desserts) at 4 Dots Shopping Complex 
 Imtiaz (supermarket)
 Junaid Jamshed
 Chen One
 Meat One
 McDonald's
 Corporate Tax Consultants 
 Subway
 KFC
 Dunkin Donuts
 Defence Officers Club
 Combined Military Hospital CMH Malir Cantt
 Askari Star Mall 
Indus project cp6
 PAF Base Malir
 Ordnance Center
 Headquarters Mechanized Division
 Headquarters Air Defence Division
 SAAD (School of Army Air Defence)
 Inter Services Selection Board (ISSB)
 DOHS 1 & 2
 Station Headquarters
 Tipu Sultan Co-operative Housing Society [Exists within Cantonment Limits]
 Gulshan-e-Roomi [Exists within Cantonment Limits]
 Air Defence Brigade
 AFOHS Complex, New Malir (Falcon Housing Scheme Phase II, Chota Malir)
 Saadi Town [Exists within Cantonment Limits]
 Falcon Complex (AFOHS) Phase I Scheme for PAF Officers & 
 Capital Cooperative Housing Society
 ASKARI-V Housing Scheme.
 KESC Society
 Sumaira Bungalows
 Gulshan-e-Umair (Exists within Cantonment limits )
 Encroached Kachhi Aabadi
 Cantt Broast (Fast Food Restaurant)''' 
 Rizwan Pakwan House.
 Cantt Bazaar Area.
 D. O. H. S. Phase I
 D. O. H. S. Phase II
 Air Defence Mart (A.D Mart)
Ahmed Hanif Rajpoot Pakwan (Restaurant)
Rehmat-e-Shireen (Bakery) 
Four Dots Market
 Check Post 1 to Check Post 6
 Phase one market

Colleges and schools

 Karachi Institute Of Medical Sciences, CMH Malir Cantt 
 Fazaia Intermediate College, Malir Cantt (previously named as PAF Intermediate College & School, Malir Cantt)
 Army Public Schools & Colleges System
 Cantonment Board Montessori, Model School & College
 Government Degree Science College, Malir Cantt
 F G Public School & College Malir Cantt Karachi

See also
 Army Cantonment Board, Pakistan
 Malir River
 Malir Town
 Malir District
 Cantonment
 Saadi Town
 Gulshan-e-Osman
Saadi Town

References

External links
 

Cantonments in Karachi
Cantonments of Pakistan